Agrisius bolovena is a moth of the subfamily Arctiinae. It is found in Laos.

References

Moths described in 2012
Lithosiini
Moths of Asia